Pete Sampras defeated Gustavo Kuerten in the final, 6–1, 6–7(2–7), 7–6(7–5), 7–6(10–8) to win the men's singles tennis title at the 2000 Miami Open.

Richard Krajicek was the reigning champion, but did not participate this year.

Seeds 
All thirty-two seeds received a bye to the second round.

Draw

Finals

Top half

Section 1

Section 2

Section 3

Section 4

Bottom half

Section 5

Section 6

Section 7

Section 8

External links 
 Main draw

Men's Singles